The Population Control Bill, 2019 (or, Population Regulation Bill, 2019) is a proposed bill introduced in the Rajya Sabha in July 2019 by Rakesh Sinha. The purpose of the bill is to control the population growth of India. According to the World Population Prospects 2019 report by the United Nations, the population of India is set to overtake that of China within a decade. The proposed bill was signed by 125 Members of Parliament (MP) and is yet to become an act of law.

Summary 
On 7 February 2020, the Constitution (Amendment) Bill, 2020 was introduced in the Rajya Sabha by Anil Desai, a Shiv Sena MP. Desai proposed to amend the Article 47A of the Constitution of India to state -

The 2020 bill proposes to introduce a two-child policy per couple and aims to incentivize its adoption through various measures such as educational benefits, taxation cuts, home loans, free healthcare, and better employment opportunities. The 2019 bill proposed by Sinha talks about introducing penalties for couples not adhering to the two-child policy such as debarment from contesting in elections and ineligibility for government jobs.

In July 2022, it was reported that BJP Mp Ravi Kishan was going to introduce private members' bill on Population control.
In the same mouth Giriraj Singh supported calls for Population control laws.

Reception 
The bill has been criticised by some commentators as rooted in islamophobic sentiment. Columnist Shivanshu K. Srivastava wrote "It is urgently required that our lawmakers pass the Population Control Bill under which an upper limit to the number of children a couple can have is specified. Couples exceeding this limit must be penalised."

See also
 Population control
 Human overpopulation
 Two-child policy

References 

Proposed laws of India
Population
 
Health programmes in India
Demographics of India
Human overpopulation
Population ecology
Birth control in India